Groom Independent School District is a public school district based in Groom, Texas (USA).

Located in Carson County, portions of the district extend into Armstrong, Donley, and Gray counties.

Groom ISD has one school that serves students in grades kindergarten through twelve.

History
The district changed to a mixed schedule in fall 2022, in which class is not held on either a Monday or a Friday.

Academic achievement
In 2009, the school district was rated "recognized" by the Texas Education Agency.

Special programs

Athletics
Groom High School plays six-man football.

See also

List of school districts in Texas

References

External links
Groom ISD

School districts in Carson County, Texas
School districts in Armstrong County, Texas
School districts in Donley County, Texas
School districts in Gray County, Texas